Roger Wayne Garrison (born 1944) is an American professor of economics at Auburn University, and an adjunct scholar of the Ludwig von Mises Institute.

He is a proponent of the Austrian School of economics and wrote the book Time and Money, which presents a graphical framework for capital-based macroeconomics and offers a critique of Keynesian graphical analysis. Garrison received an electrical engineering degree in 1967 from the University of Missouri–Rolla and a master's degree in economics from the University of Missouri–Kansas City in 1974. Garrison received his Ph.D. in economics from the University of Virginia in 1981. Garrison has lectured all over the world, including the London School of Economics.

Mark Skousen, in Vienna and Chicago refers to Garrison as "one of the premier Austrian macroeconomists today." (p. 113)

See also
 Kaleidics

References

External links
 
 Professor Garrison's homepage
 Audio/Video of Roger W. Garrison

1944 births
Living people
People from Joplin, Missouri
Auburn University faculty
Mises Institute people
Missouri University of Science and Technology alumni
University of Missouri–Kansas City alumni
University of Virginia alumni
Austrian School economists
Economists from Missouri
21st-century American economists